Germany was represented at the 1956 Summer Olympics by a United Team of Germany of athletes from the Federal Republic of Germany (FRG) (West Germany) and, for the first time at Summer Games, also from the German Democratic Republic (GDR) (East Germany) which had not joined in 1952. Also, the Saarland athletes who had to enter as a separate team in 1952 could now join in even though the accession of their state was not yet in effect. Thus, this was the only Olympic team ever to comprise athletes from three German states.

Most of the Games were held in Melbourne, Australia, but due to Australian quarantine regulations the equestrian events were held five months earlier in Stockholm, Sweden. 158 competitors, 134 men and 24 women, took part in 95 events in 15 sports.

Events 

The horse Halla carried rider Hans Günter Winkler to two Gold medals, and one more in 1960 for an all-time record.

Heinz Fütterer, who had tied the 100m world record and set some European records, was a favorite for medals, but was injured before the games in an event held in the GDR.

Compared to 1952, where no Gold had been won, the Germans improved significantly, but still won more than twice as many Silver than Gold, being ranked joint 4th in total medals.

Medalists
Nationality in brackets.

Gold
Wolfgang Behrendt (East Germany) — Boxing, Men's Bantamweight
Michael Scheuer and Meinrad Miltenberger (both from West Germany) — Canoeing, Men's K2 1.000m Kayak Pairs
Hans-Günter Winkler (West Germany) — Equestrian, Jumping Individual
Hans-Günter Winkler, Fritz Thiedemann, and Alfons Lütke-Westhues (all from West Germany) — Equestrian, Jumping Team
Helmut Bantz (West Germany) — Gymnastics, Men's Long Horse Vault
Ursula Happe (West Germany) — Swimming, Women's 200m Breaststroke

Silver
Karl-Friedrich Haas (West Germany) — Athletics, Men's 400 metres
Klaus Richtzenhain (East Germany) — Athletics, Men's 1.500 metres
Christa Stubnick (East Germany) — Athletics, Women's 100 metres
Christa Stubnick (East Germany) — Athletics, Women's 200 metres
Gisela Köhler (East Germany) — Athletics, Women's 80m Hurdles
Harry Kurschat (West Germany) — Boxing, Men's Lightweight
Fritz Briel and Theo Kleine (both from West Germany) — Canoeing, Men's K2 10.000m Kayak Pairs
Therese Zenz (West Germany) — Canoeing, Women's K1 500m Kayak Singles
August Lütke-Westhues (West Germany) — Equestrian, Three-Day Event Individual
August Lütke-Westhues, Otto Rothe, and Klaus Wagner (all from West Germany) — Equestrian, Three-Day Event Team
Liselott Linsenhoff, Anneliese Küppers, and Hannelore Weygand (all from West Germany) — Equestrian, Dressage Team
Karl-Heinrich von Groddeck, Horst Arndt, and Rainer Borkowsky (all from West Germany) — Rowing, Men's Coxed Pairs
Wilfried Dietrich (West Germany) — Wrestling, Men's Greco-Roman Heavyweight

Bronze
Heinz Fütterer, Leonhard Pohl, Lothar Knörzer, and Manfred Germar (all from West Germany) — Athletics, Men's 4 × 100 m Relay
Marianne Werner (West Germany) — Athletics, Women's Shot Put
Michael Scheuer (West Germany) — Canoeing, Men's K1 10.000m Kayak Singles
Reinhold Pommer (West Germany), Horst Tüller (East Germany) and Gustav-Adolf Schur (East Germany) — Cycling, Men's Team Road Race
Liselott Linsenhoff (West Germany) — Equestrian, Dressage Individual
Günther Brennecke Hugo Budinger, Werner Delmes, Hugo Dollheiser, Eberhard Ferstl, Alfred Lücker, Helmut Nonn, Wolfgang Nonn, Heinz Radzikowski, Werner Rosenbaum, and Günther Ullerich (all from West Germany) — Field Hockey, Men's Team Competition
Eva-Maria ten Elsen (East Germany) — Swimming, Women's 200m Breaststroke

Athletics

Men's 110m Hurdles 
Martin Lauer
 Heat — 14.2s
 Semifinals — 14.4s
 Final — 14.5s (→ 4th place)

Berthold Steines
 Heat — 14.3s
 Semifinals — 14.5s (→ did not advance)

Men's Marathon 
Lothar Beckert — 2:42:10 (→ 19th place)
Kurt Hartung — 2:52:14 (→ 28th place)
Klaus Portadnik — did not finish (→ no ranking)

Boxing

Canoeing

Cycling

Tandem
Friedrich NeuserGünther Ziegler — 10th place

Team pursuit
Kurt GieselerRolf NitzscheSiegfried KöhlerWerner Malitz — 12th place

Team road race
Horst TüllerGustav-Adolf SchurReinhold Pommer — 27 points (→  Bronze Medal)

Individual road race
Horst Tüller — 5:23:16 (→ 4th place)
Gustav-Adolf Schur — 5:23:16 (→ 5th place)
Reinhold Pommer — 5:24:38 (→ 18th place)
Erich Hagen — 5:26:38 (→ 22nd place)

Fencing

One fencer represented Germany in 1956.

Men's foil
 Günter Stratmann

Men's épée
 Günter Stratmann

Men's sabre
 Günter Stratmann

Football

Gymnastics

Hockey

Rowing

The United Team of Germany had 12 male rowers participate in five of the seven rowing events in 1956.

 Men's single sculls
 Klaus von Fersen

 Men's double sculls – 4th place
 Thomas Schneider
 Kurt Hipper

 Men's coxless pair
 Helmut Sauermilch
 Claus Heß

 Men's coxed pair – 2nd place ( silver medal)
 Karl-Heinrich von Groddeck
 Horst Arndt
 Rainer Borkowsky

 Men's coxless four
 Willi Montag
 Horst Stobbe
 Gunther Kaschlun
 Manfred Fitze

Sailing

Shooting

Two shooters represented Germany in 1956.

50 m rifle, three positions
 Rudi Sigl
 Albert Sigl

50 m rifle, prone
 Rudi Sigl
 Albert Sigl

Swimming

Water polo

Weightlifting

Wrestling

References

External links
Official Olympic Reports
International Olympic Committee results database

Germany
1956
Summer Olympics